The Transport Driver Interface or TDI is the protocol understood by the upper edge of the Transport layer of the Microsoft Windows kernel network stack.

Transport Providers are implementations of network protocols such as TCP/IP, NetBIOS, and AppleTalk.

When user-mode binaries are created by compiling and linking, an entity called a TDI client is linked into the binary.  TDI clients are provided with the compiler.  The user-mode binary uses the user-mode API of whatever network protocol is being used, which in turn causes the TDI client to emit TDI commands into the Transport Provider.

Typical TDI commands are TDI_SEND, TDI_CONNECT, TDI_RECEIVE.

The purpose of the Transport Driver Interface is to provide an abstraction layer, permitting simplification of the TDI clients.

See also 
 Windows Vista networking technologies

References 
 Windows XP Driver Development Kit documentation.

Further reading 

 
 
 
 
 

Network protocols
Windows communication and services